"Universe Cowards", also known briefly by Universe Hipsters, is a musical duo consisting of Super Junior's Heechul and Buzz's Min Kyung-hoon. The duo debuted on the hit show, Knowing Bros as a project duo and released their first ever single, "Sweet Dream". The duo name is a mix of Hee-chul's nickname, "Universe Big Star" and Buzz's song, "Coward".

Discography

Filmography

Television

Accolades

References

Knowing Bros
Korean hip hop groups